Ovidiu Bali (born 14 February 1975) is a Romanian boxer. He competed in the men's heavyweight event at the 1996 Summer Olympics.

References

1975 births
Living people
Romanian male boxers
Olympic boxers of Romania
Boxers at the 1996 Summer Olympics
People from Bușteni
Heavyweight boxers